Sepiella is a genus of cuttlefish encompassing around seven species.

Classification

Genus Sepiella
Sepiella cyanea
Sepiella inermis, Spineless cuttlefish
Sepiella japonica, Japanese spineless cuttlefish
Sepiella mangkangunga
Sepiella ocellata
Sepiella ornata, Ornate cuttlefish
Sepiella weberi

External links

Cuttlefish
Cephalopod genera
Taxa named by John Edward Gray